Toros Mexico was a professional indoor soccer team based in Tijuana, Mexico, that played in the United States-based Premier Arena Soccer League. They played their home games at Parque UniSantos in Tijuana. The team was led by owner and head coach Joe Pollard.

The Toros played the 2009-10, 2010–11, and 2011–12 seasons at Arena Furati as "Revolución Tijuana". In September 2012, Ramon Quezada and Eduardo Vele sold the team to head coach Joe Pollard but retained the rights to the old name and logo.

On September 11, 2014, the Ontario Fury purchased the Toros and announced that the team would serve as an official developmental squad for the Fury. Ontario hired owner Joe Pollard as a Fury assistant coach and he will continue to run the Toros. The team will play in the Premier Arena Soccer League, starting in 2014-15.

Year-by-year

References

External links
Toros Mexico official website

 
Premier Arena Soccer League teams
Sports teams in Tijuana
2009 establishments in Mexico
Mexican indoor football teams
Association football clubs established in 2009